Jung Kwang-Min (born January 8, 1976) is a South Korean footballer.
He played for FC Seoul.

Club career

International career

References

External links
 

1976 births
Living people
Association football defenders
South Korean footballers
South Korea international footballers
FC Seoul players
Daegu FC players
K League 1 players